Ikun-Shamash or Iku-Shamash was a King of the second Mariote kingdom who reigned c. 2500 BC. According to François Thureau-Dangin, the king reigned at a time earlier than Ur-Nanshe's of Lagash. He is one of three Mari kings known from archaeology, and probably the oldest one. Another king was Iku-Shamagan, also known from a statue with inscription, in the National Museum of Damascus. The third king is Lamgi-Mari, also read Išgi-Mari, also known from an inscribed statue now in the National Museum of Aleppo.

In his inscriptions, Ikun-Shamash used the Akkadian language, whereas his contemporaries to the south used the Sumerian language. His official title in the inscriptions was "King of Mari" and "ensi-gal", or "supreme Prince" of the deity Enlil.

He is known from a statue with inscription, which he dedicated to god Shamash.

Ikun-Shamash's territory seems to have included southern Babylonia.

Statue
Ikun-Shamash's votive statue, set by one of his officials, was discovered in the city of Sippar; the inscription reads: 

The statue is located in the British Museum.

Citations

Kings of Mari
25th-century BC rulers
25th-century BC people